is a Japanese sprinter. He competed in the men's 4 × 400 metres relay at the 1984 Summer Olympics.

References

1960 births
Living people
People from Nanao, Ishikawa
Sportspeople from Ishikawa Prefecture
Japanese male sprinters
Japanese male hurdlers
Olympic male sprinters
Olympic male hurdlers
Olympic athletes of Japan
Athletes (track and field) at the 1984 Summer Olympics
Asian Games gold medalists for Japan
Asian Games silver medalists for Japan
Asian Games medalists in athletics (track and field)
Athletes (track and field) at the 1982 Asian Games
Medalists at the 1982 Asian Games
Japan Championships in Athletics winners